Charles Montague Shaw (23 March 1882 – 6 February 1968) was an Australian character actor, often appearing in small supporting parts in more than 150 films.

Shaw was born in Adelaide, South Australia, Australia.

He began his acting career in the Australian theatre, before moving on to Britain and elsewhere in the British Empire. His first film role was in The Set-Up (1926). He later found success in the film serial market, often playing professors and paternal supporting roles. His most known role came in 1936 as Professor Norton in the popular serial Undersea Kingdom, starred by Crash Corrigan.

Montague Shaw died in Woodland Hills, Los Angeles, California, at the age of 85. He was buried in Valhalla Memorial Park Cemetery.

Selected filmography

 With Edged Tools (1919) - Jack Meredith
 The Set-Up (1926) - Cliff Barton
 The Water Hole (1928) - Mr. Endicott
 Morgan's Last Raid (1929) - Gen. Rogers
 Square Shoulders (1929) - B.T. Cartwright
The Silent Witness (1932) - Inspector Robbins
 Devil's Lottery (1932) - Assistant Inspector (uncredited)
 Letty Lynton (1932) - Ship's Officer at Christmas Party (uncredited)
 The Man Called Back (1932) - Scotland Yard Official (uncredited)
 Blondie of the Follies (1932) - Specialist (uncredited)
 Pack Up Your Troubles (1932) - Wrong Eddie's Father
 The Mask of Fu Manchu (1932) - Curator Dr. Fairgyle - British Museum Official (uncredited)
 Sherlock Holmes (1932) - Judge
 Payment Deferred (1932) - Mr. Edwards (uncredited)
 Silver Dollar (1932) - Washington Party Guest (uncredited)
 The Mummy (1932) - Gentleman #1 at Cairo Party (uncredited)
 Rasputin and the Empress (1932) - Minor Role (uncredited)
 Cynara (1932) - Constable (uncredited)
 Cavalcade (1933) - Major Domo (uncredited)
 Today We Live (1933) - Ambulance Corps Commanding Officer (uncredited)
 Gabriel Over the White House (1933) - British Delegate to Debt Conference (uncredited)
 The Big Brain (1933) - Minor Role (uncredited)
 The Masquerader (1933) - Speaker of the House (uncredited)
 Brief Moment (1933) - Lytton (uncredited)
 Fog (1933) - Ship Officer (uncredited)
 Dancing Lady (1933) - First Nighter (uncredited)
 Queen Christina (1933) - King Gustavus Adolphus (uncredited)
 Cross Country Cruise (1934) - Mr. Collins (uncredited)
 Beloved (1934) - Alexander Talbot
 Bedside (1934) - Dr. Moeller - at Opera (uncredited)
 The Mystery of Mr. X (1934) - Doctor (uncredited)
 Journal of a Crime (1934) - Ambassador at Dinner Party (uncredited)
 The House of Rothschild (1934) - Stock Trader
 Riptide (1934) - Tring (uncredited)
 Uncertain Lady (1934) - Mr. Weston (uncredited)
 Glamour (1934) - Throat Doctor (uncredited)
 Sisters Under the Skin (1934) - Brown
 All Men Are Enemies (1934) - Major (uncredited)
 Shock (1934) - Major (uncredited)
 The Girl from Missouri (1934) - Speaker at Banquet (uncredited)
 One More River (1934) - Guest (uncredited)
 Charlie Chan in London (1934) - Doctor (uncredited)
 Love Time (1934) - Major Domo (uncredited)
 Jealousy (1934) - Judge (uncredited)
 The Man Who Reclaimed His Head (1934) - A Dignitary (uncredited)
 The Winning Ticket (1935) - President of Insurance Company (uncredited)
 Carnival (1935) - Baby Judge (uncredited)
 Vanessa: Her Love Story (1935) - Dr. Lancaster (uncredited)
 Les Misérables (1935) - Factory Foreman (uncredited)
 Vagabond Lady (1935) - Hotel Manager (uncredited)
 Becky Sharp (1935) - British Nobleman (uncredited)
 Atlantic Adventure (1935) - Ship Captain (uncredited)
 Diamond Jim (1935) - Stockbroker (uncredited)
 The Dark Angel (1935) - Passenger on Train (uncredited)
 Two Sinners (1935) - Mr. Gryllis
 Streamline Express (1935) - Physician (uncredited)
 A Feather in Her Hat (1935) - Man (uncredited)
 Kind Lady (1935) - Passport Clerk (uncredited)
 A Tale of Two Cities (1935) - Chief Registrar (uncredited)
 Sylvia Scarlett (1935) - Minor Role (uncredited)
 Professional Soldier (1935) - Minister (uncredited)
 Two in the Dark (1936) - Richard Denning (uncredited)
 The Leathernecks Have Landed (1936) - Doctor (uncredited)
 The Story of Louis Pasteur (1936) - British Reporter (uncredited)
 Little Lord Fauntleroy (1936) - Mr. Semple (uncredited)
 The Unguarded Hour (1936) - Registrate (uncredited)
 Champagne Charlie (1936) - Board Member (uncredited)
 The King Steps Out (1936) - Russian Delegate (uncredited)
 Undersea Kingdom (1936, Serial) - Norton
 The White Angel (1936) - Old Officer (uncredited)
 My American Wife (1936) - Butler
 15 Maiden Lane (1936) - Jim - a Guest (uncredited)
 Ace Drummond (1936, Serial) - Dr. Trainor
 Love on the Run (1936) - Hotel Manager (uncredited)
 Riders of the Whistling Skull (1937) - Professor Flaxon
 When You're in Love (1937) - Attorney (uncredited)
 Parole Racket (1937) - Judge Grayson
 The Frame-Up (1937) - James (J.R.) Weston
 The Devil Is Driving (1937) - First Judge (uncredited)
 It's All Yours (1937) - Pendleton (uncredited)
 The Sheik Steps Out (1937) - Dr. Peabody - Minister
 Radio Patrol (1937, Serial) - Mr. Wellington
 Nation Aflame (1937) - President of the United States
 No Time to Marry (1938) - Mr. Winthrop
 Start Cheering (1938) - Dr. Atwell - Board Member (uncredited)
 When G-Men Step In (1938) - Professor Atterbury (uncredited)
 Flash Gordon's Trip to Mars (1938, Serial) - Clay King
 Four Men and a Prayer (1938) - Barrister (scenes deleted)
 Extortion (1938) - Dean Latham (uncredited)
 Kidnapped (1938) - Scotch Statesman
 Lord Jeff (1938) - Magistrate (uncredited)
 Little Miss Broadway (1938) - Miles
 Gateway (1938) - Captain
 Smashing the Rackets (1938) - Grand Juryman (uncredited)
 Suez (1938) - Elderly Man
 Mr. Moto's Last Warning (1939) - Adm. Lord Streetly (uncredited)
 Risky Business (1939) - Second Executive (uncredited)
 The Three Musketeers (1939) - Ship Captain
 Buck Rogers (1939, Serial) - Professor Huer
 The Sun Never Sets (1939) - Colonial Affairs Official (uncredited)
 Daredevils of the Red Circle (1939, Serial) - Dr. Malcolm
 Stanley and Livingstone (1939) - Sir Oliver French
 The Rains Came (1939) - General Keith
 Rio (1939) - Aristocratic Man (uncredited)
 Scandal Sheet (1939) - Dean Crosby
 Tower of London (1939) - Majordomo (uncredited)
 Zorro's Fighting Legion (1939) - Pablo
 Charlie Chan's Murder Cruise (1940) - Inspector Duff
 The Gay Caballero (1940) - George Wetherby
 The Mysterious Dr. Satan (1940) - Prof. Thomas Scott
 The Green Hornet Strikes Again! (1940, Serial) - Weaver - Gang Chemist
 Puddin' Head (1941) - Judge (uncredited)
 Charley's Aunt (1941) - Elderly Professor
 Burma Convoy (1941) - Major Hart
 Hard Guy (1941) - Anthony Tremaine, Sr.
 Holt of the Secret Service (1941, Serial) - Chief John W. Malloy
 Dick Tracy vs. Crime, Inc. (1941, Serial) - Dr. Jonathan Morton (uncredited)
 Bombay Clipper (1942) - Captain Caldwell (uncredited)
 Law of the Jungle (1942) - Sgt. Burke
 The Dawn Express (1942) - Franklin Prescott (uncredited)
 Perils of the Royal Mounted (1942, Serial) - Commissioner Phillips [Chs.13,15]
 The Pride of the Yankees (1942) - Mr. Worthington (uncredited)
 Thunder Birds (1942) - Doctor
 The Black Swan (1942) - Assemblyman (uncredited)
 Random Harvest (1942) - Julia's Husband (uncredited)
 G-Men vs. the Black Dragon (1943) - Prof. Nicholson [Ch. 3-4]
 Appointment in Berlin (1943) - Langly (uncredited)
 Isle of Forgotten Sins (1943) - The Commissioner (uncredited)
 The Lodger (1944) - Stage Manager (uncredited)
 Wilson (1944) - Harry L. White (uncredited)
 Faces in the Fog (1944) - Judge (uncredited)
 Tonight and Every Night (1945) - Old Bobby (uncredited)
 Confidential Agent (1945) - Customs Officer (uncredited)
 An Angel Comes to Brooklyn (1945) - Sir Henry Bushnell
 The Verdict (1946) - Businessman (uncredited)
 Monsieur Verdoux (1947) - Mortgage Banker (uncredited)
 The Private Affairs of Bel Ami (1947) - Surgeon
 The Imperfect Lady (1947) - Minor Role (uncredited)
 Ivy (1947) - Stevens (uncredited)
 Thunder in the Valley (1947) - Judge (uncredited)
 Unconquered (1947) - Judge's Aide (uncredited)
 Road to the Big House (1947) - Judge
 The Pilgrimage Play (1949) - Caiaphas (final film role)

References

External links

 
 

1882 births
1968 deaths
Australian male stage actors
Australian male film actors
Male film serial actors
20th-century Australian male actors
Australian expatriate male actors in the United States
Australian expatriate male actors in the United Kingdom